Hồng Lĩnh (Chữ Hán: 鴻嶺) is a mountain range in Hà Tĩnh Province, Vietnam. Hồng Lĩnh is the tên chữ Sino-Vietnamese name (literally "red mountain range"); the demotic tên nôm folk name is Rú Hống.

The mountains famously have 99 peaks. Nguyễn Huệ built the Trung Đô Citadel on Hồng Lĩnh mountain. The mountains were the place of retirement of Nguyễn Du. In earlier days villagers went into the Hồng Lĩnh mountains at times of poor crops for hunting and harvesting rattan and leaves to make raincoats and hats. Hồng Lĩnh Mountain is now suffering ecological damage from people harvesting mật nhân (Eurycoma longifolia).

References

Mountains of Vietnam
Landforms of Hà Tĩnh province